Abdullah Ali Mohammad Hassan Al-Bloushi (Arabic: عبد الله علي; born 21 February 1985) is an Emirati footballer who plays for Dibba as a midfielder .

Ali has played professionally for Al-Nasr Dubai SC, Al-Ahli Dubai F.C. and Emirates Club.

References

External links
 

1985 births
Living people
Emirati people of Baloch descent
Emirati footballers
Association football midfielders
Al-Nasr SC (Dubai) players
Emirates Club players
Al Ahli Club (Dubai) players
Hatta Club players
Dibba FC players
UAE First Division League players
UAE Pro League players